Barassi is an Italian word. It may refer to:

 Barassi (name)
 Barassi (play), a play by Tee O'Neill about Ron Barassi
 Barassi Line, imaginary line in Australia which approximately divides areas 
 Barassi International Australian Football Youth Tournament, international Australian rules football tournament for junior players 
 Coppa Ottorino Barassi, defunct amateur association football competition

Italian words and phrases